Indy Eleven is an American professional soccer team based in Indianapolis, Indiana. Founded in 2013, the team made its debut in the North American Soccer League in 2014, before moving to the United Soccer League in 2018. The franchise plays its home games at IU Michael A. Carroll Track & Soccer Stadium, with plans for a new stadium in the city's downtown district.

History

Thanks in part to efforts from a grassroots soccer organization, better known as the supporters group Brickyard Battalion, on January 16, 2013, the NASL announced that an Indianapolis expansion team owned by Ersal Ozdemir, CEO of Keystone Group LLC, would join the league in 2014. Ozdemir named Peter Wilt as the team's first President and General Manager, this after the veteran American soccer executive had served in a consulting role to explore the viability of professional soccer in Indianapolis in the three months leading up to the January 2013 announcement.

The name and club colors were officially revealed to the public on April 25, 2013 during a ceremony held at Indianapolis' Soldiers and Sailors Monument. The team was named after the 11th Indiana Volunteer Infantry Regiment, an infantry regiment that served with notoriety in the Union Army during the American Civil War. Colonel Lew Wallace commanded the regiment, which was mustered on April 25, 1861. The team name reflects both the culture of the game and pays homage to the history of the state. The number also is an obvious reference to the number of players on the field when at full strength. The number eleven is also important to the world-renowned Indianapolis 500, with the race traditionally featuring eleven rows of cars and drivers and the first race being held in 1911.

Indy Eleven named former Indiana University standout, U.S. international and English Premier League and Major League Soccer veteran Juergen Sommer as its first Head Coach/Director of Soccer Operations on June 11, 2013.

On October 1, 2013 the team announced Kristian Nicht as their first signing.

Even though the team did not begin play until the spring 2014 season, the team announced in November 2013 that it had already sold over 7,000 season tickets, and in capping season ticket sales, became the first team in NASL history to have a wait list for season tickets.

The team made its NASL regular-season debut on April 12, 2014, in a 1–1 draw against the Carolina Railhawks at home in front of 11,048 fans at Carroll Stadium.

On June 2, 2015, Juergen Sommer was fired as manager, with Tim Regan taking over in an interim capacity. Regan's interim role ended on December 2 with Tim Hankinson being appointed as the club's manager.

Indy Eleven won the 2016 Spring Championship after an undefeated season. The team, in a game called "The Miracle at the Mike," overturned a three-goal tiebreaker deficit to secure its first title.

On January 31, 2017, the Eleven announced that they would seek to join Major League Soccer during the league's expansion efforts for teams to join by 2020. The Eleven were passed over in the initial 2017 bidding.

On November 28, 2017, the Eleven announced that Tim Hankinson would not be returning as manager for the 2018 season.

On January 10, 2018, the Eleven announced they had left the NASL and joined the United Soccer League for the 2018 season. Martin Rennie was then named as the Eleven's new head coach on January 16.

On March 27, 2020, The Shop Indy teamed up with Indy Eleven to start selling t-shirts with "Indy Eleven Cares" on it. The t-shirts are being sold in response to the COVID-19 pandemic. Funds from the t-shirt sells will go to the Community Health Network Foundation's Lisa Borinstein Caregiver Assistance Fund to help employees and caregivers pay for medical expenses, transportation, food, and more.

On June 16, 2021, Indy Eleven and head coach Martin Rennie agreed to mutually part ways after four seasons. Rennie managed 99 matches and was the longest tenured coach in Indy Eleven history.

On November 16, 2021, Indy Eleven named Mark Lowry as the team's new head coach and fourth in club history.

MLS
Indianapolis became the 12th team to apply for one of four available expansion spots in the MLS, submitting their application just before the January 31, 2017 deadline. However, on November 29, 2017, MLS Commissioner Don Garber announced the four finalist cities for the round of expansion and Indianapolis was not among them. Subsequently, Indy Eleven released a statement claiming, "We are planning on being a finalist for the next round of MLS expansion opportunities." Despite Indy Eleven's persistence to establish a stadium deal with the city and a location for the venue, other cities surpassed their efforts and were awarded franchises. This included Cincinnati, Nashville, Sacramento, St. Louis, and Charlotte, along with a new team in Austin.

Greg Stremlaw reiterated after Charlotte was accepted to the MLS in December, 2019, as the league's 30th team, that Indy Eleven is still committed to their bid and believes further expansion will occur. Stremlaw stated, "I think we have a very strong application" and claimed that the ownership group and the bid will stick to the process that they have followed throughout the expansion talks.

Indy Eleven Women
On September 24, 2021, it was announced that Indy Eleven would enter the USL W-League as part of the league's inaugural season. The team was the 17th team to be announced for the amateur women's league.

Record

This is a partial list of the last five seasons completed by Indy. For the full season-by-season history, see List of Indy Eleven seasons.

1. Avg. attendance include statistics from league matches only.
2. Top goalscorer(s) includes all goals scored in league, league playoffs, U.S. Open Cup, CONCACAF Champions League, FIFA Club World Cup, and other competitive continental matches.

Colors and crest
The name "Eleven" references the eleven men who take to the field representing Indiana and also pays homage to Indiana's 11th Regiment Indiana Infantry in the American Civil War, while the navy colored checkered background is a nod to both Indianapolis' auto-racing culture and the Brickyard Battalion supporters group. Lady Victory from the Soldiers' and Sailors' monument is the focal point of the crest. The color scheme is the same as that of the civic flag of Indianapolis.

Kits
Predominantly red, white and blue, the jerseys unveiled on October 1, 2013, also featured a sublimated checker board pattern paying homage to Indianapolis' rich auto racing heritage centered around the Indianapolis Motor Speedway. The jerseys were manufactured by Diadora and Honda was the primary sponsor.

The jerseys used from 2017-2020 were manufactured by Adidas with Honda remaining the sponsor. In 2021, USL entered into an agreement with sports apparel manufacturer Puma as the leagues official apparel partner. As part of this move, several teams including Indy Eleven changed to Puma as their kit manufacturer.

Sponsorship

Supporters

Brickyard Battalion

The primary supporters group for the Indy Eleven is the Brickyard Battalion and were established on August 3, 2011. The supporters group has its origins in a grassroots campaign to elicit local support for bringing professional soccer to Indianapolis. Membership consists of more than 2,000 supporters, with over 4,000 officially registered supporters throughout the state of Indiana; affiliate chapters in the greater Indianapolis area and beyond include, but are not limited to: Slaughterhouse-19 BYB, Battery 37 BYB and Cologne – Germany BYB (an affiliate chapter based in Cologne, Germany).

Rivalries

LIPAFC
Indy Eleven first played against Louisville City FC in the third round of the 2015 U.S. Open Cup, a game Louisville City won, 2–0. The two clubs would meet again in a series of friendlies the following two seasons, as well as the third round of the 2016 U.S. Open Cup, where Indy would defeat Louisville by a score of 2–1. The arrival of the Eleven to the United Soccer League in 2018 resulted in the two becoming divisional rivals, and was given the unusual title of "Louisville-Indianapolis Proximity Association Football Contest", or "LIPAFC" during the season by both clubs on social media.

Stadium
Indy Eleven have played their home matches at IU Michael A. Carroll Track & Soccer Stadium, in Downtown Indianapolis throughout their existence except for 2018 through 2020, when they played at the nearby Lucas Oil Stadium.

In early 2014, Indy Eleven sought to build a new $87 million stadium with a capacity of 18,500 seats, but were not able to build the political support to finance their plan. On January 13, 2015, House Bill 1273 was submitted to the Indiana General Assembly, proposing to pay for the stadium by expanding ticket taxes through 2045 instead of ending in 2023 at a projected $5 million per year, but the bill failed to be passed.

In 2018, the club announced that they would play their home matches at Lucas Oil Stadium, home of the Indianapolis Colts. IU Carroll Stadium continued to be used as a secondary venue for if the home matches needed to be moved due to scheduling conflicts at Lucas Oil Stadium.

In 2019, the club announced a plan to build Eleven Park, a new $550 million mixed-use development, with a new stadium with a capacity of 20,000 as the centerpiece. This site is planned to include 600 apartments,  of office space,  of retail space, and a 200-room hotel. Ersal Ozdemir stated that is "the opportunity to create a vibrant community that will attract individuals and families from near and far to live, work and play". The club is proposing to fund $400 million for the project, with the remaining $150 million being financed through a public-private partnership. In February, 2019, the Indy Eleven ownership asked lawmakers to fund $150 million of a soccer-specific stadium in the city.

On April 8, 2019, the Indiana House Ways and Means Committee unanimously voted to allow Indy Eleven to negotiate a stadium regardless of whether the team is accepted into the MLS or not. This subsequently passed through the Senate and Governor Eric Holcomb approved plans to build the stadium.

On January 31, 2020, it was reported that the stadium's capacity might be adjusted downward from the original 20,000 to 12,000. Greg Stremlaw noted that the stadium will not be smaller than 12,000 seats and “will be built to ensure we can properly accommodate the fan base associated with leading the USL Championship league, but also be able to expand to all MLS specifications if and as needed". On February 3, 2021, the club stated it would return to Carroll Stadium starting with the 2021 season while the new stadium is constructed.

The club announced on June 24, 2022, that it had acquired  of land bounded by Kentucky Avenue, West Street, and the White River and will construct a 20,000 seat multi-purpose stadium starting in spring 2023 and opening in spring 2025. The complex will include apartments, offices, retail, and a hotel and is projected to cost $1 billion. The site in southwest downtown Indianapolis was formerly the location of the Diamond Chain company and was acquired by Ozdemir's Keystone Group, which will handle development of the complex. Upon completion, the stadium itself will be owned by the Indianapolis Capital Improvement Board.

Players and staff

Team management

Honors

See also

 List of Indy Eleven records and statistics

References

External links

 
 Video of club's NASL introduction
 Video of club's jersey unveiling, sponsorship, and first player

 
Association football clubs established in 2013
North American Soccer League teams
2013 establishments in Indiana
Sports teams in Indianapolis
Soccer clubs in Indiana
USL Championship teams